Henry Ferguson (died 1777) was a baker, trader and political figure in Nova Scotia. He was a member of the 1st General Assembly of Nova Scotia.

Ferguson was named a justice of the peace for Lunenburg County in 1767. He was named an inspector (surveyor) of pickled fish in 1754. Ferguson was buried in Halifax on June 25, 1777.

References 
 A Directory of the Members of the Legislative Assembly of Nova Scotia, 1758–1958, Public Archives of Nova Scotia (1958)

Year of birth missing
1777 deaths
Nova Scotia pre-Confederation MLAs